Suresh Deshmukh is an Indian politician from Parbhani  of Maharashtra who belongs to the Indian National Congress. He was member of Maharashtra Legislative Council from Parbhani-Hingoli Local Authorities Constituency and Former Parbhani district president of Indian National Congress.

References 

Indian National Congress (Organisation) politicians
Members of the Maharashtra Legislative Council
Year of birth missing (living people)
Living people
Indian National Congress politicians from Maharashtra